Lewis Bradford (24 December 1916 – 1984) was an English professional footballer who played as a centre half.

Career
Born in Swadlincote, Bradford played for Preston North End, Kilmarnock, Bradford City and Newport County, making a total of 97 league appearances.

He later played non-league football for Trowbridge Town.

References

External links

1916 births
1984 deaths
English footballers
Preston North End F.C. players
Kilmarnock F.C. players
Bradford City A.F.C. players
Newport County A.F.C. players
Trowbridge Town F.C. players
English Football League players
Scottish Football League players
Association football central defenders